Scott Simpson may refer to:

Scott Simpson (pole vaulter) (born 1979), Welsh pole-vaulter
Scott Simpson (golfer) (born 1955), American golfer
Scott Simpson (politician) (born 1959), New Zealand National Party MP
Scott Simpson (Australian rules footballer)
 Scott Simpson, American actor who voiced in Blue Submarine No. 6